Sündü or Sundy or Syundi or Syundyu may refer to:
Sündü, Absheron, Azerbaijan
Sündü, Gobustan, Azerbaijan
 Sundy, São Tomé and Príncipe